Morkovcha (Koryo-mar: /), also known as Korean-style carrots or Korean carrot salad, is a spicy marinated carrot salad. It is a Koryo-saram variant of kimchi.

History 

Koryo-saram (ethnic Koreans located in post-Soviet countries) created the dish as they did not have supplies of Baechu cabbage, the main ingredient in traditional kimchi. In Central Asia, where many Koryo-saram have lived since the deportation of 1937, the salad is also named morkovcha, which is a combination of Russian morkov ("carrot") and Koryo-mar cha, derived from Korean chae meaning salad-type banchan. The salad was unknown in South Korea until recently, when Russo-Koreans' return migration as well as Russian and Central Asian immigration became common. However, it has gained an international following, being served in most cafeterias throughout post-Soviet countries, sold in many supermarkets, and featured regularly as an appetizer (zakuska) and a side dish on dinner tables and in holiday feasts set by all ethnicities of the former Soviet Union.

Ingredients 
The typical ingredients are finely julienned carrots, garlic, onion, ground red pepper, ground coriander seeds, vinegar, vegetable oil, salt and pepper. It may also include sesame seeds.

See also

References

Carrot dishes
Central Asian cuisine
Kimchi
Russian Korean cuisine
Salads
Soviet cuisine